Mylor may refer to:

 Mylor, Cornwall, a civil parish in Cornwall
 Mylor Bridge, a village in Mylor parish
 Mylor Churchtown, in Mylor parish
 Mylor Creek, a tidal creek in Mylor parish
 Mylor, South Australia, a town and locality in Australia
 Saint Mylor, correctly known as Saint Melor